Perirhithrum marshalli is a species of tephritid or fruit flies in the genus Perirhithrum of the family Tephritidae.

Distribution
Zimbabwe, South Africa.

References

Tephritinae
Insects described in 1920
Diptera of Africa